John Kennedy, 8th Earl of Cassilis (April 1700 – 7 August 1759) was a Scottish peer. He succeeded to the titles of 10th Lord Kennedy and 8th Earl of Cassilis on 23 July 1701.

He held the office of Governor of Dumbarton Castle between 1737 and 1759.

On the death of the 8th Earl, a competition arose, both for the estates and for the title of Earl of Cassilis, between William, Earl of March and Ruglen, heir general, and Sir Thomas Kennedy of Culzean, 4th Baronet, the heir male. The Court of Session found the right to the estates to be in the latter, 29 February 1760; and the same was found with regard to the title on a reference to the House of Lords, 27 January 1762.

Family
He was the son of John Kennedy, and his wife Elizabeth Hutchinson (c. 1668 – 10 March 1734) daughter of Charles Hutchinson (M.P.), and his wife Isabella Boteler or Butler, daughter of Sir Francis Boteler or Butler of Hatfield Woodhouse. Lord Kennedy was grandson of John Kennedy, 7th Earl of Cassilis.

He married Lady Susan Hamilton, daughter of John Hamilton, 1st Earl of Ruglen, on 24 October 1738.

References

Earls of Cassilis
1700 births
1759 deaths
John